George Garfield Hall (5 March 1925 – 6 May 2018) was a Northern Irish applied mathematician known for original work and contributions to the field of quantum chemistry. Independently from Clemens C. J. Roothaan, Hall discovered the Roothaan-Hall equations.

Education and career
For  his work on the Roothaan-Hall equations, Hall was awarded a Ph.D. (1950) supervised by John Lennard-Jones.  He then lectured at Cambridge University as Assistant in Research in Theoretical chemistry. He was elected to a Fellowship at St John's College, Cambridge in 1953. From 1955 to 1962 he lectured in Mathematics at the Imperial College, London.  In 1957–58 he spent a year with Per-Olov Löwdin in Uppsala, Sweden. He became Professor of Mathematics at the University of Nottingham in 1962. In 1982 he took early retirement from Nottingham University and was appointed an emeritus professor. He  moved in 1983 to Kyoto University, Japan, returning to Nottingham in 1988. He has collaborated with (inter alia) A.T. Amos, K. Collard, and D. Rees. He was Emeritus Professor and Senior Research Fellow in the Shell Centre for Mathematical Education at the University of Nottingham.

He was awarded several honorary degrees for his work: a DSc by Maynooth University (2004), a ScD by Cambridge University and a DEng by Kyoto University. He was a member of the International Academy of Quantum Molecular Science.

Hall had three children and six grandchildren. He died peacefully in Nottingham at the age of 93 on 6 May 2018.

Books
G. G. Hall, Matrices and tensors. Pergamon (1963).
G. G. Hall, Applied Group Theory. Longman (1965) & American Elsevier Publishing Co., Inc. (1967).
G. G. Hall, Molecular Solid-State Physics. Springer (1991).

References

External links
His International Academy of Quantum Molecular Science page
A bibliography
Another bibliography

1925 births
2018 deaths
Scientists from Belfast
Alumni of St John's College, Cambridge
Fellows of St John's College, Cambridge
British chemists
20th-century British mathematicians
21st-century British mathematicians
Academics of the University of Nottingham
Members of the International Academy of Quantum Molecular Science
Theoretical chemists
Mathematicians from Northern Ireland